The Regents of the University of Colorado is the governing board of the University of Colorado system, the system of public universities in the U.S. state of Colorado. Established under Article IX, Section 9 of the Constitution of Colorado, it has 9 voting members. The board also has three non-voting representatives that represent the students, staff, and faculty of the CU system.

The regents oversee the university's budget, hire the university's president and other top university officials, and set tuition and priorities. They select a chair and vice-chair from their own membership.

Elected Members

The board's 9 voting members (regents) are chosen in biennial partisan elections and serve staggered six-year terms. One regent is elected to represent each of Colorado's eight congressional districts and another is elected by the state at large.

Campuses
The four campuses in the University of Colorado system are:

University of Colorado Boulder
University of Colorado Denver
University of Colorado Colorado Springs
University of Colorado Anschutz Medical Campus

References

External links
 Official website

State agencies of Colorado
University of Colorado
University of Colorado